The 2016 Belmont Stakes was the 148th running of the Belmont Stakes. The  race, known as the "test of the champion", is the final jewel in Thoroughbred horse racing's American Triple Crown series, and was held on June 11, 2016, three weeks after the Preakness Stakes and five weeks after the Kentucky Derby.  The race, which had no Triple Crown at stake (as Derby winner Nyquist lost in the Preakness), was broadcast by NBC beginning at 5:00 p.m. EDT, with pre-race coverage on NBCSN starting at 3:00 p.m. The race was won by Creator by a nose over Destin. 2016 Preakness Stakes winner Exaggerator finished eleventh.

The attendance for the event was 60,114.

Field
Only four horses from the 2016 Preakness Stakes came to New York to contest the Belmont: Exaggerator, the Preakness winner; Cherry Wine, the runner-up; Stradivari, who had finished fourth; and Lani, who had finished fifth. Of these, only Exaggerator and Lani had also run in the Kentucky Derby, finishing second and ninth respectively. Nyquist, winner of the 2016 Kentucky Derby and third in the Preakness, missed the Belmont due to illness.

The field also included five horses from the 2016 Kentucky Derby who had not run in the Preakness: Suddenbreakingnews (5th in the Derby), Destin (6th), Brody's Cause (7th), Creator (13th), and Trojan Nation (16th).

The field was rounded out by four "new shooters" — horses who had not run in either of the two preceding Triple Crown races. These were Governor Malibu, Gettysburg, Seeking the Soul, and Forever d'Oro. Governor Malibu was the only stakes winner among these; the rest were long shots. Front-running Gettysburg was entered by his owner, WinStar Farm as a "rabbit", to ensure a decent early pace for their other entry, Creator. To ensure there was no conflict of interest, WinStar also switched Gettysburg's trainer from Todd Pletcher (who already had Destin and Stradivari in the Belmont) to Steve Asmussen, the trainer of Creator.

The field was drawn on 8 June and the Preakness Stakes winner Exaggerator was installed as the 9/5 morning line favorite with thirteen entries.

Race
The weather forecast predicted rain but it held off and the track was fast. As expected, Gettysburg went to the early lead, and set a moderate pace — slow compared to the fractions in shorter races, but relatively fast by the standards of the Belmont. Destin raced about a length behind Gettysburg for the first mile, then moved to the lead.

Meanwhile, Creator had broken slowly and spent the first half mile at the back of the pack. Jockey Irad Ortiz Jr. then moved the colt up to sixth place down the backstretch, continuing to save ground on the rail. As they entered the stretch, Creator was full of run but had nowhere to go, surrounded by other horses. Ortiz waited patiently until a hole opened, then burst through, rapidly closing on Destin to win by a nose. It was just the fourth photo finish in Belmont Stakes history.

Lani closed from last to third to round out an all-gray trifecta. The favorite, Exaggerator, had been closer to the front than was normal for him, and raced wide, struggling with jockey Kent Desormeaux to go faster. When Desormeaux finally asked for his run, Exaggerator had no response. Desormeaux said, "I nursed him to the quarter pole and set him down, put him down for a mad drive and said, 'Show me your stuff,' and there was nothing there." Exaggerator finished eleventh.

It was trainer Steve Asmussen's first Belmont Stakes win. "Obviously we're very proud of the horse. ... I really thought the horse tried to win late. He really laid out there, dug in, and I personally feel fortunate for his effort", said Asmussen.

"[Creator] was calm and I just waited for somewhere to go", said Oritz. "When he got clear, he started running. It's an amazing feeling." It was the first win in a Triple Crown race for the 23-year-old jockey.

Chart

Winning owner: WinStar Farm and Bobby Flay
Breeder: Mt. Brilliant Broodmares
Margins: nose, 1 lengths
Time: 2:28.51
Track: Fast
Attendance:  60,114

Payout
The 148th Belmont Payout Schedule

 $2 Exacta (13 – 2 ) – $269.00
 $2 Trifecta (13 – 2 – 10) – $2,751.00
 $1 Superfecta (13 – 2 – 10 – 1) – $13,967.50

See also
2016 Kentucky Derby
2016 Preakness Stakes

References

External links

Equibase chart for the race

Belmont Stakes races
Belmont Stakes
Belmont Stakes
Belmont Stakes